Don Quijote del altillo is a 1936  Argentine comedy film directed and written by Manuel Romero. Starring Luis Sandrini and Nuri Montsé.

Main cast
Luis Sandrini as Eusebio
Nuri Montsé as Urbana
Eduardo Sandrini as Martínez
Aurelia Musto as a Woman in tenancy
Roberto Blanco as Martínez's son
Mary Parets as Martínez's daughter
Luis Novella as a Greengrocer
Arturo Arcari as a Man in tenancy

External links

1936 films
1930s Spanish-language films
Argentine black-and-white films
1936 comedy films
Films directed by Manuel Romero
Argentine comedy films
1930s Argentine films